The 1952 Iowa Hawkeyes football team represented the University of Iowa in the 1952 Big Ten Conference football season. This was Forest Evashevski's first season as head coach; he was previously the head coach at Washington State.

Schedule

Game summaries

Illinois
Following the loss to Illinois, which was full of penalties and a couple of ejections for fighting, Iowa students began to throw fruit, cans, and bottles at the officials and Illinois' team as they left the field.  One Iowa student was also punched by an Illinois player in the melee.  Iowa and Illinois were not scheduled to play in 1953 and 1954, but their athletic directors decided to expand that timeline to 1958 in order to allow for a "cooling-off" period.  That time frame was eventually extended until 1967, which created a 14-season gap in the series between the conference schools.

References

Iowa
Iowa Hawkeyes football seasons
Iowa Hawkeyes football